Dane Lett (born 29 August 1990) is a New Zealand field hockey player, who plays as a defender.

Personal life
Dane Lett was born and raised in Carterton, New Zealand.

Career

National teams

Under-21
Lett debuted for the New Zealand U-21 team in 2011 at the Sultan of Johor Cup in Johor Bahru.

Black Sticks
In 2014, Lett made his official debut for the Black Sticks during a test series against Japan in Wellington.

Following his debut, Lett was left out of national squads for a number of years, reappearing in 2017. Lett won his first medal at a major tournament in 2018, taking home silver at the Commonwealth Games on the Gold Coast.

In 2019, Lett won his second silver medal with the Black Sticks at the Oceania Cup in Rockhampton.

International goals

References

External links
 
 
 
 
 

1990 births
Living people
Male field hockey defenders
People from Carterton, New Zealand
New Zealand male field hockey players
2018 Men's Hockey World Cup players
Commonwealth Games silver medallists for New Zealand
Commonwealth Games medallists in field hockey
Field hockey players at the 2018 Commonwealth Games
Field hockey players at the 2022 Commonwealth Games
Field hockey players at the 2020 Summer Olympics
Olympic field hockey players of New Zealand
2023 Men's FIH Hockey World Cup players
20th-century New Zealand people
21st-century New Zealand people
Medallists at the 2018 Commonwealth Games